Trymax is a Bulgarian producer of sports accessories. Their main headquarters is in Sofia where business operations are conducted, while manufacturing is done in the United States and China. Product distribution is assigned to several regional offices in Dubai, Moscow and Marbella. 

In 2014, the company invited action film star Max Ryan to Bulgaria, where he participated in several socialite functions. Other notable events organized in part by Trymax include fighting tournaments such as 'Rising Force', where kick-box champion Mustafa Lakhsem took part as a company representative.

Brand ambassadors 

The company has numerous different representatives in different sports such as:

Tsvetan Genkov – Bulgarian footballer – striker with spells at Dynamo Moscow, Wisła Kraków and is currently at Levski Sofia
Javier Merida - Spanish paratriathlete European champion
Kiril Terziev – Bulgarian freestyle wrestler – bronze medal winner at the 2008 Summer Olympics in Beijing in his category (up to 74 kg).

References 

Sportswear brands
Manufacturing companies of Bulgaria
Sport in Bulgaria
Sporting goods manufacturers
Manufacturing companies based in Sofia
Manufacturing companies established in 2010
Bulgarian brands
Sporting goods brands
2010 establishments in Bulgaria